Hohenstein is a village and a civil parish (Ortsteil) of the German town of Strausberg, located in the district of Märkisch-Oderland in Brandenburg. As of 2007 its population was of 233.

History
The village was first mentioned in 1375 with the name of Hohensten.

Geography
Hohenstein is situated in the east of Strausberg, on a road linking the town and Buckow, close to Ruhlsdorf and to the western entrance to the Märkische Schweiz Nature Park. It is also connected with the nearby village of Gladowshöhe by a road that links Rehfelde and Garzau-Garzin with Klosterdorf.

See also
Strausberg
Gladowshöhe
Ruhlsdorf

References

External links

 Hohenstein website

Villages in Brandenburg
Strausberg
Former municipalities in Brandenburg
1370s establishments in the Holy Roman Empire
1375 establishments in Europe